Pedro Abraham Valdelomar Pinto (April 27, 1888 – November 3, 1919) was a Peruvian narrator, poet, journalist, essayist and dramatist; he is considered the founder of the avant-garde in Peru, although more for his dandy-like public poses and his founding of the journal Colónida than for his own writing, which is lyrically posmodernista rather than aggressively experimental. Like Charles Baudelaire in 19th century Paris, he claimed to have made his country aware for the first time of the relationship between poetry and the market, and to have recognized the need for the writer to turn himself into a celebrity.

He has been pictured on the Peruvian sol S/ 50 banknote since its introduction in 1991.

Biography
Valdelomar was born and grew up in the port city of San Andres Pisco; his childhood in this idyllic coastal setting and within an affectionate household are often the basis for his short stories and poems. After studying at the well-known Guadalupe School in Lima, in 1905 he enrolled to study literature at the National University of San Marcos. However, in 1906 he began contributing caricatures and poems to a number of illustrated magazines and periodicals, such as Aplausos y silbidos, Monos y Monadas, Actualidades, Cinema and Gil Blas, and he soon abandoned university life completely for the world of journalism. In 1910 he started writing chronicles for newspapers, and published his first stories the following year, including two novels, La ciudad de los tísicos and La ciudad muerta, which show the influence of Gabriele d'Annunzio.

Valdelomar was also becoming increasingly interested in politics, and in 1912 he participated in the successful presidential campaign of Guillermo Billinghurst. To reward him for his support, Billinghurst named Valdelomar editor of the newspaper El Peruano in 1912, and the following year sent him on a diplomatic posting to Rome, where he wrote his best-loved and prize-winning story, El Caballero Carmelo. In 1914, after Billinghurst's overthrow, Valdelomar was forced to return to Peru, where he worked as secretary to historian Jose de la Riva-Agüero, under whose influence he wrote La mariscala, the biography of Francisca Zubiaga (1803–1835), wife of the president, Agustín Gamarra.

He returned to work as a journalist, writing for the newspaper La Prensa under the aristocratic pseudonym "El Conde de Lemos", collaborating with the young José Carlos Mariátegui, while cutting a provocative dandy-like figure on the streets and in the cafes of Lima (particularly the Palais Concert); here he coined his famous sorites, "El Perú es Lima; Lima es el Jirón de la Unión; el Jirón de la Unión es el Palais Concert; y el Palais Concert soy yo" (Peru is Lima; Lima is the Jirón de la Unión; the Jirón de la Unión is the Palais Concert; and the Palais Concert is me"). He founded the ephemeral but influential avant-garde magazine Colónida, which saw four issues in 1916 (the first three edited by Valdelomar himself), and headed the intellectual movement of the same name. That same year he was a contributor to Las voces múltiples, an anthology of modernista poetry by eight members of the Colonida group, which was less avant-garde than their criticism. The anthology included Valdelomar's best-known poems, "Tristia" and "El hermano ausente en la cena de Pascua...", both of which influenced the early writing of César Vallejo, whom Valdelomar had taken under his wing on the latter's arrival in Lima in 1916. Valdelomar promised to provide a prologue for Vallejo's first collection of poetry, Los heraldos negros, but his ambitious lecture tours of the provinces distracted his attention. Vallejo's collection finally appeared without the prologue in 1919, although it had been completed in 1918—which has led to some confusion over its publication date. In the meantime, Valdelomar was giving lectures the length and breadth of the country; as part of his commitment to reaching and educating a broad audience, but also as part and parcel of his efficient showmanship and entrepreneurial sense, he offered this first lectures in each town at a discount price—or for free—to workers and peasants, and later hiked up the admission price to a by-now eager public.

On a tour of Ayacucho, in the Huamanga province, he suffered a fall that led to a fractured spine and severe concussions; he died next day, aged 31.

His best fiction is contained in two short story collections: El caballero Carmelo (1918) and Los hijos del sol (1921); the first inaugurates the genre of "cuentos criollos", or local fiction, focused on daily life in the port town of Pisco (the coastal area usually left out of accounts of Peru which focused on either Lima or the Andean regions); the second was an ambitious modernista reworking of legends of life under the Inca empire. He was also the author of two important essays: the first, "La sicologia del gallinazo", an anti-tourist, unembellished guide to Lima and its psychology, which would later influence Julio Ramón Ribeyro; the second, "Belmonte el tragico". a study of bullfighting.

Legacy
A Google Doodle on 27 April 2019 commemorated Valdelomar’s 131st birth anniversary.

Bibliography

Novel
1911 - La Ciudad de los Tísicos
1911 - La Ciudad Muerta
Yerba Santa

Story
1918 - El Caballero Carmelo
1921 - Los hijos del sol
1924 - El vuelo de los condores
1927 - El Caballero Carmelo

Poem
1916 - Las Voces Múltiples
 Tristitia-  1916, PERU
 El hermano ausente en la cena de Pascua

Theater
1914 -El vuelo (Drama inspired by the flight of Carlos pioneering Tenaud of Peruvian aviation)
1916 - Verdolaga (Tragedy of single that fragments are conserved)
 Palabras (modernist and allegorical Tragedy in one act)

Essay
1910 - Con la argelina al viento (crónicas)
1917 - Ensayo sobre la psicología del gallinazo
???? - Con la argelina al viento
1918 - Belmonte, El Trágico. Ensayo de una estética futura a través del arte nuevo

Biography
1915 - La Mariscala

See also
Peruvian Literature

References

External links

Peruvian male writers
Peruvian male short story writers
Peruvian dramatists and playwrights
1888 births
1919 deaths
People from Pisco, Peru
National University of San Marcos alumni
Male dramatists and playwrights
20th-century dramatists and playwrights
20th-century short story writers
20th-century male writers